Feorlig is a small crofting settlement on the northwest shore of Loch Caroy near Dunvegan on the Isle of Skye in the Highlands of Scotland and is in the council area of Highland.

References

Populated places in the Isle of Skye